Sandra Diane Seacat (October 2, 1936 – January 17, 2023) was an American actress, director and acting coach best known for her innovations in acting pedagogy—blending elements of Strasberg, and Jungian dream analysis—and for a handful of coaching success stories.

Early life and career 
Seacat was the first of three daughters born to Russell Henry and Lois Marion Seacat in Greensburg, Kansas. Involved in theatre from her mid-teens on, Seacat first focused on method acting while attending Northwestern University, earning her degree and relocating to New York, where she studied with Actors Studio alumnus Michael Howard and later at the Studio with its director Lee Strasberg.

Seacat first attracted attention—as Sandra Kaufman, her then married name—in July 1962, in the Barnard-Columbia Summer Theater production of Somerset Maugham's The Noble Spaniard. Despite finding the play "rather silly,” Back Stage's reviewer "found particular pleasure in Sandra Kaufman's characterization." She appeared once more that summer, this time under Michael Howard's direction, in the US premiere of Leonid Andreyev's The Waltz of the Dogs. Amidst a generally favorable review, Back Stage reserved "bouquets" for Kaufman and 2 others, while The Village Voice predicted, “Miss Kaufman’s appetizing warmth [is] destined to bring many future stages alive.”

The following winter, an eventful few hours—attaining both Actors Studio membership and first-time motherhood—gave rise to roughly 2 years of seeming inactivity, a notable exception being Kaufman’s Broadway debut, a small part in the Actors Studio production of Chekhov’s Three Sisters. Her full-fledged return came on October 12, 1965, in Atlanta’s Community Playhouse (again under Howard’s direction), when, having beaten out Rosemary Forsyth for the title role in Shaw’s Saint Joan, Kaufman's portrayal was described by The Journal-Constitution as "a masterpiece of suave speech and faultless timing [which] enhances the lyrical quality of Shaw's lines." "Kaufman," it continues, "is both saint and genius; her portrayal leaves nothing to be desired."

After resuming her studies in New York, Kaufman again collaborated with her former teacher, along with Gene Hackman, Tom Aldredge and Chicago import Mina Kolb, to form the Second City Revue – a short-lived New York offshoot of the like-named Chicago-based improvisational troupe. On June 5, 1966, the ABC News series Directions '66 featured the group.

Between 1968 and 1970, Seacat appeared in regional theater in Toronto, Atlanta and New Orleans.

Under her married name, she lived in the gated Coney Island community of Sea Gate, Brooklyn.

Teaching 
During the 1970s, Seacat taught at the Lee Strasberg Theatre Institute, City College of New York's Leonard Davis Center for the Performing Arts, the Actors Studio, and she taught privately. Among her clients were Steve Railsback, Lance Henriksen, Christopher Reeve and Mickey Rourke, who later said of his time with Seacat, "That's when everything started to click."

Over the next decade, while teaching in New York and Los Angeles, Seacat was credited with a number of such breakthroughs, including those of Jessica Lange, Rachel Ward and Marlo Thomas. During this period, she also helped pioneer the practice of dream work, in which actors study and play characters from their dreams. Among those studying the technique was Seacat's daughter, Greta, who went on to become an acting coach. In addition, actresses Melanie Griffith and Gina Gershon publicly credited Seacat's use of the dream method with improving their craft.

Also attending those classes were future Songwriter's HOF inductee Desmond Child, then a self-professed "fly on the wall" alongside Lange, Rourke, Michelle Pfeiffer and others. Speaking in 2018 with Music & Musicians, he gratefully acknowledged Seacat's mentorship, noting the correlation between her early efforts at linking text to actor and Child's later knack for matching song to singer. Similarly, Child embraced Seacat's vision of the artist as a "wounded healer" and the audience "a co-creator [who] heals through that process." "As songwriters," Child concurred, "we have a sacred job to help them connect."

Acting teacher Alex Cole Taylor in 2010 told Backstage that Seacat taught him compassion for his students. In 2012, CNN's profile of acting coach Elizabeth Kemp coupled Seacat with Lee Strasberg as "legendary acting coaches." Longtime Seacat student Laura Dern, speaking at the January 2012 Golden Globe Awards presentation, thanked "Sandra Seacat, Frank Capra, Lucille Ball, [and] everybody who's ever inspired any of us" at the conclusion of her acceptance speech for Best Actress.

In 2012 and 2013, Seacat was a faculty member at the annual Film Forum hosted by the University of Arkansas's Winthrop Rockefeller Institute, organized by fellow Actors Studio alumnus Robert Walden.

While Seacat always shunned publicity, both for her own sake and that of her clients, she did go on record regarding a few of her more famously self-proclaimed students such as Jessica Lange, Mickey Rourke, Meg Ryan and, on multiple occasions, Laura Dern, whose longstanding relationship with Seacat is the subject of an article and the accompanying video published by The Hollywood Reporter in February 2015.

In February 2018, Seacat and her third husband, Thurn Hoffman, were featured among more than 20 couples seen in the music video for Night Things' cover of The Everly Brothers' 1959 hit "(Till) I Kissed You."

Directing 
Seacat directed one movie, In the Spirit, shot in 1988, released in April 1990, and starring Marlo Thomas and Elaine May. The year-plus gap between wrap and release saw one previously announced cast member, Louise Lasser, end on the cutting room floor, as well as the addition of what Variety later termed "the stupid framing device of a mystical narrator," presumably inserted in hopes of patching over rough spots in the narrative, in particular the dramatic shift in tone occurring midway through the film.

That any such hopes had gone unrealized was the general consensus amongst critics, who were nonetheless divided between those who found such flaws forgivable—such as The Boston Globe ("An Endearing Mess") or Hal Hinson of The Washington Post ("disjointed [but] deliciously addlebrained")—and those who did not, such as Janet Maslin, who dubbed In the Spirit "a nervous new-age comedy more notable for good intentions than good luck," and the Los Angeles Times, which noted that what begins as "a richly comic" vehicle for Ms. May abruptly "crumbles around her at roughly its halfway point." Variety, however, perceived a method to Spirit's messiness, "a throwback to the looser, madcap '60s," featuring "big name talent [working on] a low budget" to make a "pic freed of mainstream good taste and gloss."

In August 2007, Seacat, with Jamie Wollrab, directed her daughter, Greta Seacat, along with Shannon Woodward, Justin Chatwin and Johnny Lewis in Elizabeth Meriwether's play The Mistakes Madeline Made at the Dairy Center for the Arts in Boulder, Colorado.

Personal life and death 
Seacat married three times, the first two ending in divorce: to Arthur Kaufman, to actor Michael Ebert, and, from 1982 until her death, to Thurn Hoffman. She had a daughter by her first husband, acting coach Greta Seacat. 

On January 17, 2023, at the age of 86, Seacat died in Santa Monica, California, of primary biliary cholangitis, an auto-immune disease. Predeceased by sister Sherrell Kay Seacat Heft in 2018, she was survived by her husband, her daughter, and sister Serena Seacat.

Filmography

Film

Television

Students of Sandra Seacat 

 Tiana Alexandra
 Roseanna Arquette
 Kirk Baltz
 Mikhail Baryshnikov
 Lawrence Bender
 Lili Bordán
 Raoul Bova
 Josh Brolin
 Betty Buckley 
 Nicolas Cage
 Hélène Cardona
 Reeve Carney
 Lynda Carter
 Justin Chatwin
 Desmond Child
 Scott Coffey
 Common
 Blythe Danner
 Robert Davi 
 Loren Dean
 Rebecca DeMornay
 Johnny Depp
 Laura Dern
 Peter Dobson
 Peter Falk
 Frances Fisher
 Joely Fisher
 Tricia Leigh Fisher
 Andrew Garfield
 Martha Gehman
 Gina Gershon
 Ryan Gosling
 Melanie Griffith
 Cornelia Guest
 Martin Henderson
 Lance Henriksen
 Tina Holmes
 Don Johnson
 Harvey Keitel
 Arfi Lamba
 Jessica Lange
 Peggy Lipton
 Melanie Mayron
 Tatum O'Neal
 Michelle Pfeiffer
 Janina Picard
 Chris Pine
 Steve Railsback
 Christopher Reeve
 Isabella Rossellini
 Mickey Rourke
 Meg Ryan
 Diane Salinger
 Ally Sheedy
 Brooke Shields
 Helen Slater
 Alex Cole Taylor
 Marlo Thomas
 Dov Tiefenbach
 Rosie Vela
 Rachel Ward
 Michelle Williams
 Treat Williams
 Stefano Zanchetti

Notes

References

Further reading 
 Kelly, John: "1970: June Havoc produces A Streetcar Named Desire in New Orleans". The New Orleans Times-Picayune. April 7, 2010
 Sainer, Arthur: "Obit to Inge and other bouquets: Natural Affection, P From B, In the Cage". The Village Voice. June 21, 1973
 Sainer, Arthur: "We Move From Darkness Into Light: Mrs. Warren's Profession, Economic Necessity, The Son". The Village Voice. April 12, 1976
 Walden, Robert: "The Method and the Myth: Is the controversial technique still relevant for today's actor?" Backstage. April 21, 2009

External links 

 
 Sandra Kaufman at the University of Wisconsin's Actors Studio audio collection
 Sandra Seacat at BroadwayWorld
 
  (archive)
 
 
 

1936 births
2023 deaths
20th-century American actresses
21st-century American actresses
American acting coaches
Actresses from Kansas
Actresses from Los Angeles
Actresses from New York City
Actresses from Santa Monica, California
Actors Studio alumni
American film actresses
American stage actresses
City College of New York faculty
Drama teachers
Film directors from California
Northwestern University School of Communication alumni
People from Greensburg, Kansas
Film directors from Kansas
People from Sea Gate, Brooklyn